Stritch may refer to:
 Stritch (saxophone), musical instrument
 Samuel Stritch (1887–1958), American cardinal in the Roman Catholic Church
 Cardinal Stritch High School, Oregon, Ohio, named after him
 Cardinal Stritch University, Milwaukee, Wisconsin, named after him
 Stritch School of Medicine, Loyola University, Chicago, USA, named after him
 Elaine Stritch (1926–2014), American actress and singer, niece of Cardinal Samuel Stritch

See also
Stretch (disambiguation)